Saat Pardon Mein was a 2012 Pakistani romantic fantasy drama serial aired on Geo TV every Friday. Serial is written by Zanjabeel Asim Shah and directed by Yasir Nawaz, starring Qaiser Khan Nizamani, Mikaal Zulfiqar and Sohai Ali Abro. The serial consist of 24 episodes.

Plot 
Darakhshanday Badar (Sohai Ali Abro) is a young girl who lives in Bahawalpur and belongs to a family of religious descent. Her father is a prominent religious leader and she was raised with Islamic values and norms. Darakhshanday is a big fan of a television actor Ehsan Muraad (Mikaal Zulfiqar) and tries to contact him, she gets hold of his number and calls him to tell him about his fan following Ehsan being a busy man casually thanks her. Ehsan's best friend is a television producer Badar Suleman (Alyy Khan), who is going through psychological issues, wants to change his gender.

Ehsan irritated from Darakhshanday's continuous telephone calls asks Badar to talk to her Darakhshanday who doesn't know that its Badar Suleman not Ehsan Muraad who talks to her, falls in love with him and decides to escape as her father fixes her marriage. She reaches Karachi and calls Badar to tell him that she has left her home for him, Badar tells Ehsan the whole story and takes Darakhsanday to his house.

While living at Ehsan's house Darakhshanday realizes that Ehsan only wants to use her for pleasure and would never marry her. Later, amidst their unchaste relationship, she bears his child. Once she is conscious of Ehsan and is over her infatuation, Ehsan convinces her into spending a night with her. The next morning Darakhshanday regrets on her sin and asks Ehsan to marry her which Ehsan does not approve off, he suggests a live in relationship instead. Devastated Darakhshanday leaves Ehsan's house and is found by Badar, who marries her.

Cast 
 Mikaal Zulfiqar as Ehsan Muraad
 Sohai Ali Abro as Darakshanday Badar
 Alyy Khan as  Badar Suleman
 Tariq Jamil as Baba Jani
 Sabreen Hisbani as Gulabi
 Ismat Zaidi as Badar's Mom
 Farah Nadir as Javeria
 Qaisar Khan Nizamani as Haroon Kaka
 M. Zubair Khan as Farhan.

References

External links 
 

Geo TV original programming
Romantic fantasy television series
2012 Pakistani television series debuts
Urdu-language television shows
Pakistani drama television series
2013 Pakistani television series endings